Chionaspidina is a subtribe of armored scale insects established by Borchenius. But unlike many of the subtribes recognized by Borchenius, this one was found to be morphologically valid by Takagi. Similarly, in molecular analysis, Andersen et al. found a clade roughly corresponding to the subtribe Chionaspidina.

Geographical sampling and analysis indicated a number of unnamed species in the genus Chionaspis and by inference in the Chionaspidina.

Genera
Afiorinia
Albastaspis
Amphisoma
Aulacaspis
Balachowskiella
Cameronaspis
Chionandaspis
Chionaspis
Cooleyaspis
Cupidaspis
Damaia
Diaulacaspis
Duplachionaspis
Duplaspis
Eudinaspis
Fijifiorinia
Greenaspis
Guineaspis
Guizhoaspis
Haliaspis
Hemaspidis
Hybridaspis
Inchoaspis
Kuchinaspis
Laingaspis
Larutaspis
Ledaspis
Lineaspis
Madagaspis
Magnospinus
Marchalaspis
Miscanthaspis
Myrtaspis
Narayanaspis
Neochionaspis
Neoquernaspis
Phenacaspis
Pinangaspis
Pinnaspis
Poliaspis
Proceraspis
Quernaspis
Semonggokia
Serrachionaspis
Shansiaspis
Sinoquernaspis
Tenuiaspis
Trichomytilus
Unaspis

References

Diaspidini